PlugPlayer was the first widely used mobile UPnP/DLNA Control Point. Originally released for the iPhone in October 2008 with little fanfare, it has since been updated many times  eventually adding support for iPad, Android, Google TV, and Mac OS X. As of the latest release, PlugPlayer is able to act as a media player, media renderer, and media server.
The developer announced in the Google Playstore that the Android app will not be supported after 31 October 2017 .

References

Mobile software